Liblogs is a group of Canadian bloggers. The Liblogs membership consists of bloggers who generally support the Liberal Party of Canada.  Content from member blogs is aggregated on the main Liblogs website.

Founded in 2005 by blogger and Liberal activist Jason Cherniak, Liblogs now includes more than 250 blogs, and is a registered non-profit corporation.

History 
Liblogs was created around the same time as Progressive Bloggers as a reaction to The Blogging Tories.  Beginning in April 2005 as simply a small list of links included on Liberal blogs, a central website was created to aggregate content from member sites.  During the 2006 federal election, as many as ten new members joined each week.

Liblogs was originally authored by Wayne Chu in 2005. In the fall of 2006, it was completely rewritten by Liberal blogger David Graham ahead of that year's federal Liberal leadership convention.

Corporate identity 

In the spring of 2006, Cherniak realized that Liblogs was expanding beyond his initial concept of an unofficial list of Liberal bloggers. He began a fund-raising campaign in order to fund an application for non-profit corporate status.  By April 2006, Liblogs was a company with the legal name of "Blogger Support Services".

2006 Liberal leadership election 

Liblogs took off after Paul Martin announced that he would be resigning as Liberal leader following the 2006 election. The different leadership campaigns began courting bloggers; Cherniak and Rob Edger were   named as official "Stéphane Dion blog campaign co-chairs".  Other Liberal bloggers, such as John Lennard and Dan Arnold did similar work for other leadership campaigns. In July 2006, the Toronto Star and The Globe and Mail both published articles on the involvement of bloggers in the leadership campaigns.

As the Leadership Convention approached, the Liberal Party chose to invite bloggers and treat them as media. Cherniak took the opportunity to launch new features to Liblogs, including a fully bilingual template, a French name of "Liblogues," a Young Liblogs list for Young Liberals and a news section.

Liblogs News 

Liblogs News includes sections on national and regional news and politics. It is edited by journalist Jeff Jedras, who attempts to highlight the best Liberal blog postings at least once a day. The theory is that this will provide an easy way for media or others with limited time to read Liberal blogs and get a feel for what they have to say each day.

Liblogs Videos 

On March 28, 2007, Liblogs launched a new video page.  This is a page where Liberals from across Canada can post YouTube videos for easy access by other Canadians. Days later, media were reporting that the Conservatives would be unveiling new ads attacking Stéphane Dion the following week.  Mr. Cherniak called on Libloggers to create YouTube videos in order to respond to the new ads.  On April 2, the Conservatives launched a new French ad and unveiled their  campaign headquarters.  On April 3, Mr. Cherniak posted 7 new videos to the Liblogs video page and issued a press release contrasting the expensive Tory headquarters to the grassroots YouTube campaign.  This led to a Canadian Press story that was distributed to media across the country.  On April 4, 2007, the video page was included in the front-page story of The Globe and Mail and some Liberal videos were highlighted on page 4. The CP story was printed in daily papers across the country. Some examples include, the Toronto Star, Le Soleil and the Daily News (Halifax).

Split
During the 2008-2009 war in Gaza, Cherniak purged Liblogs of bloggers who expressed criticism of Israel, which also resulted in a number of resignations from Liblogs in protest. As a result, a new aggregator called LiberalsONLINE was created as another choice to Liblogs.

See also
LiberalsONLINE
Progressive Bloggers
New Democrats Online

References

External links
 Liblogs website
 Montreal Gazette article following Liblogs press conference
 link to CPAC story on blogs at the 2006 Liberal Convention

Canadian bloggers
Canadian political websites